Renai Medicity is a multi super-speciality Hospital in Kochi, Kerala, built in memory of founder late Polakulath Narayanan.

Overview
Renai Medicity is managed by Polakulath Group of Hotels, Resorts & Healthcare. The hospital is located at the heart of Kochi. The hospital has an in-patient capacity of 500 beds and has 24 hour Accident & Emergency care facilities. The nearest airport is Cochin International Airport,  from the hospital by road.

Facilities
The hospital has 500 beds and has centrally air conditioned rooms. Renai Medicity has a 24x7 Accident & Emergency care unit that can handle any emergency, the first of its kind in Kerala. It has 15 operation theaters including Hybrid OT’s for cardiothoracic surgeries and  11 separate Intensive Care Units with 120 beds. It houses more than 35 specialty and super specialty departments, multiple Cath Labs, a chest pain centre, modern radiological equipment, 24 Hour Pharmacies and clinical laboratories, suites and wards, multiple restaurants, ample car parking facilities and more.

The core departments include anesthesia and critical care, cardiology, endocrinology, gastroenterology, dental sciences, ayurveda, dermatology & cosmetology, neonatology, nephrology, neurosurgery, orthopaedics, psychiatry, plastic surgery and urology.

References

Hospitals in Kochi
Year of establishment missing